Azerbaijan and Ukraine relations took through centuries and both countries used to be the part of Russian Empire and then Soviet Union. Currently there are over 45,000 Azerbaijanis in Ukraine. Most of them live in Donetsk Oblast (8 thousand), Kharkiv - (5-6 thousand), and Dnipropetrovsk - (5-6 thousand people). The number of ethnic groups grew very rapidly - especially between 1960 and 1990, it increased 5.5 times, largely due to instability in the South Caucasus. Today, Ukraine is home to the 7th largest Azerbaijani community in the world.

The resettlement of Azerbaijanis into the territory of Ukraine is marked by certain historical events, dominated by migration processes that were primarily economic in nature. About 2,300 Azerbaijanis are native Ukrainian speakers. Ukraine is also host to a number of Azerbaijani guest workers which has yet to be ascertained.

The majority of Azerbaijanis are Muslim, mainly Shia. Azerbaijanis are one of the least religious nations in the world. They don't regularly practice their religion or show their faith in the way they dress. 

Currently, 15 regions of Ukraine have national cultural societies for Azerbaijanis. In eight regions, Sunday schools study Azerbaijani language and literature. Publication of the magazine Voice of Azerbaijan (Azerbaijani and Ukrainian) began in Kyiv in 1998. The first Azerbaijani newspaper in Ukraine, Millət (The Nation), has been published since 1991 in Crimea.

Events 
On 20 January 2011, the embassy of Azerbaijan and the Congress of Ukrainian Azerbaijanis hosted a commemorative ceremony dedicated to the Khojaly Massacre, the March Days and Black January. Heads of regional organizations of the Congress of Ukrainian Azerbaijanis (CUA), members of the Mission of the World Azerbaijanis Congress (WAC) in Ukraine, intellectuals, youth, students and activists of the diaspora celebrate national holidays like Republic Day and National Salvation Day.

On May, 2011 a restored monument to Azerbaijani soldiers of the 77th division was opened in Sevastopol.

Because most Azeris live in the eastern parts of Ukraine nearly all of them have fled to Turkey, or Western Ukraine. Many noted they could not stay because they faced discrimination by a population that is undergoing a resurgence of ethnic nationalism.

Resettlement and language

Notable people
Ukrainians of Azerbaijani origins
Oleksandr Aliyev, footballer
Oleh Babayev, Ukrainian politician, former Mayor of Kremenchuk
Renat Mirzaliyev, judoka
Ruslan Mirzaliyev, judoka
Maksym Pashayev, footballer
Pavlo Pashayev, footballer
Vugar Rakhimov, Greco-Roman wrestler
Ruslan Zeynalov, footballer

Azerbaijanis of Ukrainian origins
Aleksandr Chertoganov, footballer
Marina Durunda, rhythmic gymnast
Natalya Mammadova, volleyball player
Valeriya Mammadova, volleyball player
Oksana Parkhomenko, volleyball player
Polina Rahimova, volleyball player
Valeriy Sereda, high jumper
Mariya Stadnik, wrestler

See also 

 List of Azerbaijanis
 Azerbaijan–Ukraine relations

References

External links 
 Traditions and customs of Ukraine 
 Embassy of Ukraine in Azerbaijan 
 Embassy of Azerbaijan in Ukraine 

Ethnic groups in Ukraine
Ukraine
Muslim communities in Europe